Chamakese is a hamlet in Saskatchewan. Its coordinates are: 53°25′59″N 107°26′35″W / 53.433°N 107.443°W / 53.433; -107.443.

Unincorporated communities in Saskatchewan